Zwartsluisje is a hamlet in the Dutch province of South Holland.

Zwartsluisje is not a statistical entity, and considered part of Zuid-Beijerland and Piershil. It has place name signs, and consists of about 115 houses.

References

Populated places in South Holland
Hoeksche Waard